Train buffer may refer to:
 Buffer (rail transport)
 Buffer stop